Partizani may refer to:

 Partizani [], a village in Dalgopol Municipality, Varna Province, Bulgaria
 Partizani [], a village in Maliuc Commune, Tulcea County, Romania
 Partizani (″Partisans″), Serbo-Croatian title of the 1974 Yugoslav film Hell River
 FK Partizani Tirana, football club from Tirana, Albania
 Yugoslav Partisans, a World War II resistance movement, known in Serbo-Croatian as Partizani (″Partisans″)

See also
 Partizan (disambiguation)
 Partisan (disambiguation)